Quaker Instant Oatmeal (Instant Quaker Oatmeal until 1995) is a type of oatmeal made by the Quaker Oats Company, first launched in 1966.

Preparation
Quaker Instant Oatmeal comes in 1.5 oz (43 g) single-serving packets and is usually flavored. Flavors include but are not limited to cinnamon, apple, and honey. The oatmeal is prepared by mixing with boiling water and stirring, hence being referred to as "instant"; once mixed, the oatmeal is ready within a minute. It can also be prepared by adding up to 2/3 cup of water and microwaving for 30-60 seconds. Milk may also be used.

Taste

Although said to be quick and easy to make, the resulting oatmeal is not the same as traditional oatmeal. Quaker Instant Oatmeal has a different taste than oatmeal prepared the traditional way. This is due to how the oatmeal is processed and prepared. The mouthfeel of the oatmeal is changed as the oatmeal is finely milled to decrease cooking time, and the oatmeal is treated with chemical preservatives and flavoring.

Flavors currently available in the U.S.
Regular
Maple and Brown Sugar (also available in 50% less sugar)
Apples and Cinnamon (also available in 50% less sugar)
Raisins and Spice
Cinnamon Pecan
Cinnamon and Spice
Raisin, Dates and Walnuts
Strawberries and Cream (also available in 50% less sugar)
Peaches and Cream (also available in 50% less sugar)
Blueberries and Cream
Cinnamon Roll
Honey and Nut
Weight Control oatmeal (available in 3 flavors)
Safari Animal
Dinosaur eggs (brown sugar w/ dinosaur candies)

See also

 List of instant foods
 List of porridges
 List of dried foods
 Instant breakfast

References

Further reading
 St. Joseph News-Press - Google News Archive Search
 Proquest - Courant.com 
 Quaker Hopes Dinosaur Oatmeal Won't Be Extinct

External links

Official website

Quaker Oats Company cereals
Porridges
Instant foods and drinks
Products introduced in 1966